Norwegian Contractors AS was a concrete gravity base (GBS) structure supplier from 1974 to 1994. Aker Marine Contractors AS (AMC) was established in 1995 and is a continuance of the marine activities in Norwegian Contractors AS.

Norwegian Contractors AS have worked on following offshore platforms:
 Ecofisk tank
 Statfjord A
 Statfjord B
 Statfjord C
Gullfaks A
Gullfaks B
 Oseberg A
Gullfaks C (heaviest object ever moved by mankind)
 Draugen
 Heidrun
 Hibernia-Bohrplatform (1997)
 Nordhordland-Brücke (1994)
 Sleipner A (1993)
 Snorre
 Troll A platform (1995)

See also
 Offshore concrete structure

Engineering companies of Norway
Oil platforms
Beryl A(1976)